The Estonian Top Division 1944 was the 23rd football league season in Estonia. First round was scheduled from 21 May to 12 July. Second round from 20 July to 15 August. The season was discontinued after 7 rounds due to the Red Army attack. The front had reached Estonia on January and the battles on Estonian territory lasted until December. The system and majority of the clubs existing before were discontinued.

Entrants
JK Tervis Pärnu
Tartu Politsei Spordiring
JS Estonia Tallinn
ESS Kalev Tallinn
VS Sport Tallinn
Tallinna Spordiklubi

References

Estonian Football Championship
Football